Amanita brunnescens, also known as the brown American star-footed amanita or cleft-footed amanita is a native North American mushroom of the large genus Amanita. Originally presumed to be the highly toxic Amanita phalloides (the death cap) by renowned American mycologist Charles Horton Peck, it was described and named by George F. Atkinson of Cornell University. He named it after the fact that it bruised brown.
It differs from the death cap by its fragile volva and tendency to bruise brown. It is considered probably poisonous.

See also

List of Amanita species

References

brunnescens
Poisonous fungi
Fungi of North America
Fungi described in 1918